Korean Air Cargo Flight 8509 was a Boeing 747-2B5F, registered HL7451 and bound for Milan Malpensa Airport, that crashed due to instrument malfunction and pilot error on 22 December 1999 shortly after take-off from London Stansted Airport where the final leg of its route from South Korea to Italy had begun. The aircraft crashed into Hatfield Forest near the village of Great Hallingbury, close to but clear of some houses. All four crew on board died.

The aircraft 
The aircraft involved was a 19-year-old Boeing 747-200F freighter registered HL7451. First flown on 4 April 1980, the aircraft had completed 15,451 flights with a total flight time of 83,011 hours before its fatal flight.

INU failure and failed repair 
Following the plane's departure from Tashkent on the previous flight segment, one of its inertial navigation units (INUs) had partially failed, providing erroneous roll data to the captain's attitude director indicator (ADI or artificial horizon).  The first officer's ADI and a backup ADI were correct, a comparator alarm called attention to the discrepancy, and in daylight, the erroneous indication was easily identified.  The ADI's input selector was switched to the other INU and the correct indications returned.

At Stansted, the engineers who attempted to repair the ADI did not have the correct Fault Isolation Manual available and did not repair or replace the faulty number 1 INU.  One of them identified and repaired a damaged connecting plug on the ADI.  When the ADI responded correctly to its "Test" button, they believed the fault had been corrected, although this button only tested the ADI and not the INU. The ADI's input selector was left in the normal position.

Flight crew 
The flight crew consisted of 57-year-old Captain Park Duk-kyu (Hangul: 박득규, Hanja: 朴得圭, RR: Bak Deuk-gyu, M-R: Pak Tŭkkyu), 33-year-old First Officer Yoon Ki-sik (Hangul: 윤기식, Hanja: 尹基植, RR: Yun Gi-sik, M-R: Yun Kishik), 38-year-old Flight Engineer Park Hoon-kyu (Hangul: 박훈규, Hanja: 朴薰圭, RR: Bak Hun-gyu, M-R: Pak Hun'gyu), and 45-year-old maintenance mechanic Kim Il-suk (Hangul: 김일석, Hanja: 金日奭, RR: Gim Il-seok, M-R: Kim Ilsŏk). The captain was a former colonel and pilot in the Republic of Korea Air Force and a highly experienced airman, with a total of 13,490 flying hours – 8,495 of which were accumulated flying Boeing 747s. The first officer, in contrast, was relatively inexperienced with just 195 hours of flying experience on the 747 and a total of 1,406 flight hours. The flight engineer, like the captain, had a lot of experience flying 747s – 4,511 out of his 8,301 total flight hours were accrued in them. The maintenance mechanic had been involved with the failed INU repair.

Flight 

It was dark when the plane took off from London Stansted Airport, with the captain flying. The aircraft entered the clouds 400 feet above the terrain. When the captain banked the plane to the left, the faulty INU sent erroneous data to his ADI, preventing the instrument from showing the aircraft was in a bank. The comparator alarm sounded repeatedly, which was an indication that the aircraft's two ADI displays were in disagreement. The first officer, whose own ADI displayed the correct angle of bank, according to information from the aircraft's flight data recorder, failed to participate in full crew resource management techniques, saying nothing to challenge his captain's actions nor making any attempt to take over the flight with his own controls. The older and more experienced flight engineer did call out "Bank is not working" (translated into English from Korean in the AAIB report) 20.8 seconds before impact, "Bank Bank" (in English) 16.9 seconds before impact, "Standby indicator [in English] also not working [in Korean]" 10.2 seconds before impact, and "OY Bank" (in Korean) 1.5 seconds before impact. The captain continued to ignore the chiming alarm and made no verbal response to the flight engineer. Data from the flight recorder indicate that during this time the control wheel was commanding the aircraft into a steeper left bank. The aircraft exploded on impact.

Aftermath 
After the investigation, the United Kingdom's Air Accidents Investigation Branch (AAIB) issued recommendations to Korean Air to revise its training program and company culture, to promote a more free atmosphere between the captain and the first officer. The first recommendation of the AAIB's final accident report was that: Korean Air continue to update their training and Flight Quality Assurance programmes, to accommodate Crew Resource Management evolution and industry developments, to address issues specific to their operational environment and ensure adaptation of imported training material to accommodate the Korean culture.

The AAIB also recommended the airline review its maintenance procedures. The second and third recommendations are that:
Korean Air continues to review its policy and procedures for maintenance support at international destinations with a view to deploying sufficient of its own full-time engineers at the outstation or delegating the entire task to another operator or third-party maintenance organisation locally-based at the destination (Full Technical Handling). If neither of these approaches is practicable then the support arrangements must be detailed and of such clarity, as to preclude confusion.

Korean Air reviews its policy and procedures to ensure that a copy of the relevant pages of the Technical Log and any other transit certification documents are left on the ground at the point of departure.

In popular culture 
A March 2012 episode of Mayday also called Air Crash Investigation in the U.K. and the rest of the world (Season 11 Episode 7) titled "Bad Attitude" or "Stansted Crash" investigates this accident.

See also 
 Impact of culture on aviation safety

References

External links 
 "The AAIB interim report" – BBC – Friday 24 December 1999 (Archive)
 "AAIB Bulletin S2/2000 SPECIAL." Air Accidents Investigation Branch (Archive)
 Cockpit Voice Recorder transcript and accident summary
Boeing Expresses Condolences After Korean Air Crash – Boeing (Archive)
Boeing to Assist in Korean Air Investigation – Boeing (Archive)
 "KE-8509 Crash May Be Due to Instrument Failure." – The Chosun Ilbo
 "KAL Team Joins Flight KE-8509 Investigation." – The Chosun Ilbo (Archive)

Accidents and incidents involving cargo aircraft
London Stansted Airport
Aviation accidents and incidents in 1999
Aviation accidents and incidents in England
1999 in England
Accidents and incidents involving the Boeing 747
8509
Airliner accidents and incidents caused by pilot error
Airliner accidents and incidents caused by instrument failure
Aviation in Essex
December 1999 events in the United Kingdom
Airliner accidents and incidents in the United Kingdom
1999 disasters in the United Kingdom
Disasters in Essex